Sir John Hugo Rutherford, 2nd Baronet (31 October 1887 – 28 December 1942) was a Conservative party politician in the United Kingdom. He was Member of Parliament (MP) for Liverpool Edge Hill from 1931 to 1935. He succeeded his father as baronet in 1927.

Rutherford was the father of Prudence Hero Napier, the primatologist.

References

External links 
 

1887 births
1942 deaths
Baronets in the Baronetage of the United Kingdom
Conservative Party (UK) MPs for English constituencies
UK MPs 1931–1935